Bryan Watkins, known by his stage name Shannel (born July 3, 1979), is an American drag queen and television personality, best known for competing on the first season of RuPaul's Drag Race and later the first season of RuPaul's Drag Race: All Stars. He placed in the top four on both seasons.

Early life 
Watkins was born to Debbie and Gary Watkins on July 3, 1979, in Orange County, California. He was raised in Cypress, California, and attended Pacifica High School. He was introduced to drag at age 8 when he was taken to a Las Vegas boylesque show, and started doing drag at fifteen years old when he entered a Halloween drag contest under the name “Elvira” and won. He worked as a beauty advisor for the cosmetics company Chanel. He moved to Las Vegas, Nevada in 2000.

RuPaul's Drag Race
Shannel was announced as one of nine contestants for the first season of RuPaul's Drag Race (2009). In the third episode, she was in the bottom two with fellow competitor Akashia, and won a lip sync against her to "The Greatest Love of All" by Whitney Houston. She famously did the first "wig reveal" on the show during the lip sync. She was later eliminated in the sixth episode after losing a lip sync to "Shackles (Praise You)" by Mary Mary against Rebecca Glasscock.

Shannel was announced as being among twelve returning contestants for the first season of RuPaul's Drag Race: All Stars in 2012. Due to the team twist for the season, Shannel teamed with eventual winner Chad Michaels as the team Shad. They won the third, fourth and fifth episode challenges, until Shannel was eliminated in third place with Jujubee.

Shannel also was a drag professor for three seasons of the spin-off show RuPaul's Drag U in 2010 to 2012.

She appeared as a guest star on the first episode of Drag Race eighth season. She appeared with her  fellow season one cast on the Drag Race season ten finale, lip syncing next to Mayhem Miller.

Shannel was credited as a Creative Consultant for the premiere episode of RuPaul's Secret Celebrity Drag Race. She also made an appearance making over celebrity Nico Tortorella, though it was ultimately cut from the episode.

Career 
Outside of Drag Race, Shannel appeared in an episode of The Arrangement in 2010. She appeared in the music video for Lady Gaga's "Applause" with Raven, Morgan McMichaels, Shangela Laquifa Wadley and Detox. She was also in the video for Xelle's "Queen" in 2012. She was part of Frank Marino's Divas Las Vegas show in 2017.

In September 2019, at RuPaul’s DragCon NYC, Shannel was named as one of a rotating cast of a dozen Drag Race queens in RuPaul's Drag Race Live!, a Las Vegas show residency at the  Flamingo Las Vegas.

Controversy
On August 13 of 2022, Shannel was accused of stealing seven-hundred dollars at a drag show. Shannel repeatedly says that she did not steal the money, however she took two dollars and gave it back.

Filmography

Television

Music videos

Web series

References 

1979 births
Living people
American drag queens
People from Orange County, California
RuPaul's Drag Race contestants
Shannel